The Peter Westervelt House and Barn is located at 290 Grand Avenue in Englewood, Bergen County, New Jersey. Built in 1808, the house was added to the National Register of Historic Places on March 19, 1975.  The barn has since been demolished, and the house now forms part of a professional office development.

See also 
 National Register of Historic Places listings in Bergen County, New Jersey

References

Englewood, New Jersey
Houses on the National Register of Historic Places in New Jersey
Houses completed in 1808
Houses in Bergen County, New Jersey
National Register of Historic Places in Bergen County, New Jersey
New Jersey Register of Historic Places